Bombinhas is a municipality in the state of Santa Catarina in the South region of Brazil. It is the smallest municipality of that state in terms of area.

The municipality contains part of the  Marinha do Arvoredo Biological Reserve, established in 1990.

See also
List of municipalities in Santa Catarina

References

Populated places established in 1992
Populated coastal places in Santa Catarina (state)
Municipalities in Santa Catarina (state)